Band-e Bast is a village in Qotbabad Rural District, Kordian District, Jahrom County, Fars Province, Iran. At the 2006 census, its population was 41, in 8 families.

References 

Populated places in Jahrom County